Aubrey Lyle Dunn Jr. (born 1955 or 1956) is an American politician and banker from the state of New Mexico. He served as New Mexico commissioner of public lands from 2015 to 2019, and was a candidate for the U.S. Senate in the 2018 election. Elected as a Republican, Dunn switched parties to Libertarian in January 2018, making him the first Libertarian holder of a statewide elected office in the United States.

Early life and education
Dunn was born in Alamogordo, New Mexico, the son of politician Aubrey Dunn Sr. He earned a Bachelor of Science degree in animal science from Colorado State University.

Career 
Dunn worked for 25 years in the banking industry including 10 years as CEO and president of First Federal Bank of New Mexico. He lost in the Republican primary to Edward R. Tinsley, who went on to lose the general election to Harry Teague.

Dunn was elected as New Mexico commissioner of public lands in the 2014 election as the Republican nominee. In January 2018, he left the Republican Party and switched his voter registration to Libertarian. Dunn announced his candidacy as a Libertarian for U.S. Senate in early-2018.  He withdrew from the race in July, stating that he was leaving the race because he needed to concentrate his time and effort on his duties as land commissioner. He was replaced on the ballot by former New Mexico governor Gary Johnson.

In 2021, Dunn announced his candidacy for the 2021 New Mexico's 1st congressional district special election, running as an independent. He faced State Representative Melanie Stansbury and State Senator Mark Moores in the June 1 election. Dunn received less than 3% of the total vote.

Personal life
Dunn Jr. is the son of late New Mexico state senator Aubrey Dunn Sr., who served in the legislature from 1965 until 1980 as a Democrat. His wife, Robin Dunn, ran for Lieutenant Governor of New Mexico as a Libertarian with Bob Walsh. His son, A. Blair Dunn, ran for Attorney General as a Libertarian.

Electoral history

See also
 List of American politicians who switched parties in office
 Libertarian Party of New Mexico

Notes

References

External links
 Campaign website

|-

|-

1950s births
21st-century American politicians
Candidates in the 2008 United States elections
Candidates in the 2018 United States Senate elections
Candidates in the 2021 United States elections
Colorado State University alumni
Living people
New Mexico Commissioners of Public Lands
New Mexico Independents
New Mexico Libertarians
New Mexico Republicans
People from Alamogordo, New Mexico
Libertarian Party (United States) officeholders